Tun Mohammad Said bin Keruak (15 November 1925 – 17 November 1995) was a Malaysian politician who served as the 7th Yang di-Pertua Negeri of Sabah from January 1987 to December 1994 and 4th Chief Minister of Sabah briefly from November 1975 to April 1976. He was also father of another Malaysian politician, Salleh Said Keruak.

Honours

Honours of Malaysia 
  : 
 Commander of the Order of the Defender of the Realm (PMN) – Tan Sri (1971)
 Grand Commander of the Order of the Defender of the Realm (SMN) – Tun (1989)

References 

1925 births
1995 deaths
Bajau people
People from Sabah
Malaysian Muslims
United Sabah National Organisation politicians
Yang di-Pertua Negeri of Sabah
Chief Ministers of Sabah
Sabah state ministers
Members of the Dewan Rakyat
Members of the Sabah State Legislative Assembly
Grand Commanders of the Order of the Defender of the Realm
Commanders of the Order of the Defender of the Realm